Sachal Tyagi is an Indian television actor. He has been a part of the show Agle Janam Mohe Bitiya Hi Kijo. He has played the role of Mahendra in Hello Pratibha on Zee TV. He is Playing the Role of Shakti Singh in Mann Kee Awaaz Pratigya 2.

Television 
2007-09 Ghar Ek Sapnaa as Abhi
 2008-2009 Mata Ki Chowki as Moksh
2010 Agle Janam Mohe Bitiya Hi Kijo as Ranvijay
 2015 Hello Pratibha as Mahendra
 2021 Mann Kee Awaaz Pratigya 2 as Shakti Singh

References

External links

Living people
Year of birth missing (living people)